The Basava Purana is a 13th-century Telugu epic poem. It was written by Palkuriki Somanatha. It is a sacred text of Lingayat. The epic poem narrates the life story of philosopher and social reformer Basava (1134–1196 CE), the founder of Lingayat . He is also known by several other names such as Basavanna, Basaweshwara, Basavesha, and Basavaraja. It is also an anthology of several Lingayat saints (also known as Shiva Sharanas, devotees of Lord Shiva) and their philosophies. In contrast to campu style (poems in verse of various metres interspersed with paragraphs of prose), Somanatha adopted the desi (native) style and composed the purana in dwipada (couplets), a meter popular in oral tradition and closely related to folk songs.

Later in 1369 A.D., it was translated to Kannada language by Bhima Kavi, this version contains detailed description and in time was considered his standard biography. There are several Kannada and Sanskrit Lingayath puranas inspired by Bhima Kavi's Basava Purana.

This Telugu purana was first translated into English by C.P. Brown, a British administrator in colonial south India, in 1863.

Translations
 Siva's Warriors: The Basava Purana of Palkuriki Somanatha, Tr. by Velcheru Narayana Rao.  Princeton Univ Press, 1990. .

See also
 Vachana sahitya
 Jangam

References 

Lingayat literature
Lingayatism
Epic poems
13th-century poems
Telugu-language literature
Indian poems
Books about philosophers
Indian biographies
Kannada literature